The Xerénte or Akwẽ-Xerénte language is an Akuwẽ (Central Jê) language (Jê, Macro-Jê) of Brazil. It is spoken by the Xerente people in the Tocantins state between Rio do Sono and Rio Tocantins.

Phonology 

 Vowels /i, ɨ, u, a/ when occurring in unstressed syllables can be heard as [ɪ, ɨ̞, ʊ, ɐ].

 A [ɡ] sound is heard as an allophone of /k/ when preceding another consonant.
 /d/ can be heard as dental [d̪] when preceding /i/.
 /s/ can be heard as a post-alveolar or retroflex sibilant sound [ʃ~ʂ] when preceding /i/.
 /h/ when preceding /i/ can be heard as a voiced velar or glottal fricative sound [ɣ~ɦ].
 /h/ when preceding /k/ can be heard as a velar fricative sound [x].
 /n/ when preceding the following vowels /i, õ, ɔ/ can be heard as a palatal nasal [ɲ].
 /ɾ/ may also be heard as a retroflex flap [ɽ].

Grammar

Personal pronouns 

The nominative and emphatic forms are free morphemes with the function of subject of transitive or intransitive sentences. The absolutive pronoun prefixes mark possessors, objects of postpositions, direct objects, subjects of nominal predicates and subjects of intransitive verbs with post-verbal operators.

Notes

Jê languages
Languages of Brazil